Isaac Gilinski Sragowicz ( born 19 February 1934)  is a Colombian banker and financier currently serving as Ambassador of Colombia to Israel.

Ambassadorship
Gilinski was appointed Ambassador of Colombia to Israel by President Álvaro Uribe Vélez on 28 October 2009 in a ceremony of protocol that took place at the Palace of Nariño; he later presented his Letters of Credence in a ceremony of protocol at Beit HaNassi to the President of Israel, Shimon Peres, on 11 January 2010. Gilinski's brother, Lazar, had also served as Ambassador of Colombia to Israel in the 80's.

Personal life
Born Isaac Gilinski Sragowicz on 19 February 1934 in Barranquilla, he is the son of Lithuanian Jewish immigrants who settled in that city from Israel in the 1920s. He is married to Perla Bacal Zweiban since 1957, with whom he had three children: Jaime, Rutie, Tania. His eldest son Jaime is a prominent international banker and one of Colombia’s wealthiest men.

See also
 David de La Rosa Pérez
 Antanas Mockus Šivickas

References

1934 births
Living people
People from Barranquilla
Colombian people of Lithuanian-Jewish descent
Colombian Jews
Colombian chemical engineers
Colombian bankers
20th-century Colombian businesspeople
Academic staff of the University of Valle
Ambassadors of Colombia to Israel
People named in the Pandora Papers